St Hilda's School is an independent, Anglican, day and boarding school for girls, located in Southport, a central suburb of the Gold Coast, Queensland, Australia.

Established in 1912, St Hilda's has a non-selective enrolment policy and currently caters for approximately 1,250 students from Pre-Preparatory to Year 12, including 160 full and weekly boarders from Years 6 to 12. St Hilda's is the only girls' school in the Gold Coast region. Its brother school is The Southport School (TSS), also located in Southport, and the only boys' boarding school in the region.

The school is a member of the Queensland Girls' Secondary Schools Sports Association (QGSSSA), the Alliance of Girls' Schools Australia (AGSA), the Junior School Heads Association of Australia (JSHAA), the Association of Heads of Independent Schools of Australia (AHISA), and the Australian Boarding Schools' Association.

History 

St Hilda's School was founded in 1912, when the Diocese of Brisbane of the Anglican Church of Australia purchased an older school, Goyte-Lea, from Miss Davenport. Goyte-Lea was established prior to Federation of Australia in the late 19th century. The School was named after the seventh century Abbess of Whitby Saint Hilda. Saint Hilda was said to have turned serpents into stone, and three stone serpents are the emblem of the school's crest.

The School's first Headmistress was Catherine Bourne, for whom a series of classrooms are named.  The School's motto since establishment is Non nobis solum, Latin for "Not for Ourselves Alone".

Although always a girls' school, St Hilda's does have 'old boys'. During the Second World War, secondary schools were used as army barracks. In March 1942, St Hilda's evacuated 90 boards to Pikedale homestead near Stanthorpe. The Anglican Church relocated boys from the Church of England Boys' School in Toowoomba, to St Hilda's in April 1942, while St Hildas was also used for a short time by the 135th Medical Regiment. The school returned from Pikedale to Southport in December 1943.

From 2006 until 2016 Peter Crawley served as the first male principal of the school.

Campus

St Hilda's is situated on a single,  campus, featuring gardens and bushland, at Southport, located one hour's drive south of Brisbane on Australia's Gold Coast. The school comprises a primary school (Pre-Preparatory to Year 6), middle school (Years 7 to 9) and senior school (Years 10 to 12). The whole school is on the one grounds, although the primary school is separate from the middle and senior schools. The middle and senior schools share facilities and teaching staff. The school has two libraries, the Junior School Library and Senior School Library, as well as IT facilities.

Built in 1995, the St Hilda's School Sports complex features indoor courts suitable for basketball, netball, badminton, and volleyball; a fitness gym; an artistic and rhythmic gymnastics area including a foam pit, balance beams and vaulting horse; and a 50m heated outdoor swimming pool. The School also has one oval and outdoor tennis and netball courts. The School previously owned hockey fields opposite the Gold Coast Hospital but this land was sold and is now developed as part of the redevelopment of the Gold Coast Hospital precinct.

House system
As with most Australian schools, St Hilda's uses a [house system] to facilitate in-school competition in sporting and cultural events. A highlight of this competition is the Inter-House Musicals which are held at the Gold Coast Arts Centre. Other competitions include the Inter-House Athletics carnival, Inter-House Cross-Country, Inter-House Swimming carnival, Inter-House Drama Festival and Inter-House Debating.

The School's Houses are named after Australian plants. In the Middle and Senior schools, the houses are Banksia, Melaleuca and Karragaroo.  The corresponding Junior School Houses are Acacia, Tristania and Grevillea.

iPad Program
The school has one of the largest iPad programs in the world. The school also uses the learning management system 'Blackboard' and is an advanced user of eBooks. It is presently exploring the use of iTunes University.

Co-curriculum

Sport
St Hilda's is a member of the Queensland Girls' Secondary Schools Sports Association (QGSSSA) and the Andrews Cup, the only such school on the Gold Coast. Members of sporting teams travel to areas throughout South East Queensland to participate in sporting events.

Student Exchange Program
St Hilda's participates in a Student Exchange Program with a number of schools in the United States of America, England, New Zealand, Scotland, Canada,  and South Africa.
About 40 students, in Year 10, participate in the program each year. They travel to the exchange schools for a six-week period.

Notable alumnae
 Elise Kellond-Knight- soccer player
 Emma Snowsill- triathlete
 Kimberley Joseph
 Lauren Brant - High Five

See also

List of schools in Gold Coast, Queensland
Anglican education in Australia
List of boarding schools in Australia

References

External links

Anglican schools in Queensland
Boarding schools in Queensland
High schools in Queensland
Educational institutions established in 1912
Girls' schools in Queensland
Schools on the Gold Coast, Queensland
Junior School Heads Association of Australia Member Schools
International Baccalaureate schools in Australia
1912 establishments in Australia
Alliance of Girls' Schools Australasia